Luke Thomas (born 19 October 2002) is a Wales international rugby league footballer who plays as a  for the Warrington Wolves in the Betfred Super League.

He has spent time on loan from Warrington at the Rochdale Hornets in Betfred League 1.

Background
Thomas was born in Crewe, Cheshire, England. He is of Welsh descent.

Playing career

Early career
During his childhood, Thomas began playing rugby union before switching to rugby league at the age of 11. He played junior rugby league for Latchford Giants before joining the academy at Warrington Wolves. Luke enjoyed a successful spell with the university of Liverpool lizards.

Club career
In August 2022, Thomas made his Wolves Super League début against the Leeds Rhinos.

International career
In June 2022, he made his senior international debut for Wales in a 10–34 defeat against France. He was called up by Wales during the 2021 Rugby League World Cup as a replacement for the injured Ben Evans.

References

External links
Warrington Wolves profile
Jammer duo: Wales prop Luke Thomas a James Graham in the making

2002 births
Living people
English rugby league players
Rochdale Hornets players
Rugby league players from Cheshire
Rugby league props
Sportspeople from Crewe
Wales national rugby league team players
Warrington Wolves players